Major General (Retired) Jim Muhwezi Katugugu is a Ugandan lawyer, politician and retired military officer. He serves as the Cabinet Minister for National Security, in the Ugandan Cabinet, effective 8 June 2021.

In the past, from March 2015 until May 2016, he served as the Minister of Information and National Guidance in the Cabinet of Uganda. He had been appointed to that position in a cabinet reshuffle on 1 March 2015, replacing Rose Namayanja, who was dropped from the Cabinet.

Also, he is the Member of Parliament (MP) representing Rujumbura County, Rukungiri District. He recaptured that seat in 2021, having lost it for five years between 2016 and 2021.

Background and education
He was born in Rukungiri District on 23 August 1950. Jim Muhwezi holds the degree of Bachelor of Laws (LLB), from Makerere University, Uganda's oldest and largest public university. He also has received Senior Military Police and Security Intelligence Training from Tanzania and the former Soviet Union. In July 2009, the Law Development Center in Kampala awarded him the Diploma in Legal Practice, the prerequisite to enrolling as an advocate in Uganda and for obtaining a license to practice law in the country.

Work experience
In the 1970s Jim Muhwezi worked as a policeman in the Uganda Police Force. He was one of the combatants in the war (1981–1986) that ushered the National Resistance Movement into power. After the war, he served as a member of the National Resistance Council (NRC) from 1986 until 1996. During the same period, he concurrently served as the first Director General of the Internal Security Organisation (ISO). As head of ISO, Muhwezi is credited with cleaning up the reputation and image of the security police apparatus. During his ten-year tenure at the agency, no allegations of torture were raised against the agency. Between 1994 and 1995, he served as a member of the Constituent Assembly that drew up the 1995 Ugandan Constitution. From 1996 until 1998, Jim Muhwezi served as Minister of State in Charge of Primary Education. He was appointed Minister of Health in 2001, serving in that capacity until 2006.

Personal details
Jim Muhwezi Katugugu is married to Susan Muhwezi, a sister to Ugandan tycoon Bob Kabonero and Ambassador Richard Kabonero. He has seven children. He is reported to enjoy reading and playing golf.

Parliamentary duties
He was a member of the parliamentary committee on physical infrastructure.

See also
 Cabinet of Uganda
 Parliament of Uganda
 Uganda People's Defense Force
 Rukungiri District

References

External links
 Website of the Parliament of Uganda
 Rukungiri District Internet Portal

1950 births
Living people
People from Rukungiri District
Makerere University alumni
Ugandan generals
National Resistance Movement politicians
Ugandan police officers
Law Development Centre alumni
Government ministers of Uganda
Members of the Parliament of Uganda
21st-century Ugandan politicians